A list of films released in France in 2006.

References

External links
 2006 in France
 2006 in French television
 French films of 2006 at the Internet Movie Database
French films of 2006 at Cinema-francais.fr

2006
Films
French